La Arena District is one of ten districts of the province Piura in Peru.

References

External links
 INEI Perú

1920 establishments in Peru